Antaeotricha ogmolopha is a moth in the family Depressariidae. It was described by Edward Meyrick in 1930. It is found in Brazil (Para).

The wingspan is about 13 mm. The forewings are white with an expansible fringe of long ochreous-whitish hairscales lying in a groove beneath the anterior half of the costa and a small irregular fuscous spot on the dorsum towards the base. A subquadrate dark fuscous spot is found on the middle of the dorsum, the plical stigma an irregular dot above this, and the first discal similar, obliquely anterior, with some fuscous scales along the fold between the plical and the base, the second discal forming a linear mark continued as a slender dark fuscous streak to the apex. There is also a very oblique dark fuscous line from the middle of the costa, and a less oblique one from the costa at three-fourths, both terminated by this streak, as well as an irregular blotch of fuscous suffusion on the tornus and a dark fuscous marginal dot above the apex, three on the termen, and a more conspicuous black dot at the apex. The hindwings are light greyish.

References

Moths described in 1930
ogmolopha
Moths of South America